The ITA School of Performing Arts is a school formed as an initiative of The Indian Television Academy and founded by Anu Ranjan and Shashi Ranjan in 2001.

Special features 
Three features of the School are: Placement & Exposure, Facilities & Infrastructure and Industry Connectivity.

The Advisory Board and Faculty consists of people like:
Shatrughan Sinha, J. P. Dutta, David Dhawan, Raveena Tandon, Shashi Ranjan, Mahima Chaudhry, Jaspinder Narula, Roop Kumar Rathod, Alka Yagnik, Gulshan Grover, Rajan Shahi, Kavita K. Barjatya, Yukta Mookhey, Aroona Mookhey, Rakesh Bedi, Javed Khan, Madhushree, Mangal Mishra and Swarup Raj Medara.

References

External links 
 http://www.itaspa.in/

Drama schools in India
Educational institutions established in 2001
2001 establishments in Maharashtra